Tam-Tam is the sixth studio album by French singer Amanda Lear, released in 1983 by West German label Ariola Records.

Background
Tam-Tam was Amanda's last album with Ariola Records and was mainly recorded only to fulfill her contract with the label. It was also her first full-length release not to be produced in Munich by Anthony Monn, but only by Italian musicians, primarily Roberto Cacciapaglia who produced the entire material. The album is a blend of synthesizer-based pop and new wave music. Lyrically, it references African folklore, mainly dealing with topics such as black magic. Amanda explained in a 1983 interview: "I'm fascinated with Voodoo, Macumba, exorcisms. Basically, the sphere that goes beyond the perception of rationality".

The album artwork is credited to Graphic Studio CGD. It portrays Amanda as an African witch, complete with make-up and outfit. The dress and jewelry are credited to Artemio of Milano, and the photographs are by Angelo Deligio.

Although Lear performed songs from the album on the popular Italian TV show Premiatissima, she did not promote the album in the rest of Europe and neither did the record company because of their complicated relationship at the time. "No Regrets" was released as a single in Italy only, and no singles were released internationally to promote the album. "Bewitched" was then released as a promotional single, again only on Italian market. Lack of promotion largely contributed to Tam-Tam'''s subsequent commercial failure. The LP failed to chart and remains her lowest-selling Ariola album.

The rights to the Ariola-Eurodisc back catalogue are currently held by Sony BMG. Like most of Amanda's albums from the Ariola Records era, Tam-Tam'' has not received the official CD re-issue.

Track listing
Side A
 "Tam Tam" (Amanda Lear, Villahermosa, Roberto Cacciapaglia) – 3:37
 "Bewitched" (Amanda Lear, Tony Carasco, Roberto Cacciapaglia, Pino Nicolosi, Lino Nicolosi) – 4:32
 "Wicked Lady" (Amanda Lear, Roberto Cacciapaglia) – 4:27
 "No Regrets" (Amanda Lear, Paul Micioni, Massimiliano DiCarlo, Roberto Masala) – 4:28

Side B
 "Magic" (Amanda Lear, Roberto Cacciapaglia) – 4:14
 "It's All Over" (Amanda Lear, Sergio Menegale, Raffaele Ferrato) – 3:39
 "Gipsy Man" (Amanda Lear, Tony Carrasco, Pino Nicolosi) – 4:29
 "Music Is" (Amanda Lear, Roberto Cacciapaglia) – 3:36

Personnel
 Amanda Lear – lead vocals
 Paolo Bocchi – sound engineer
 Roberto Cacciapaglia – record producer, musical arranger
 Maurizio Cannici – executive producer
 Tony Carrasco – drum programming, production assistance
 Claudio Cattafesta – electric guitars
 Angelo Deligio – photography
 Stefano Previsti – keyboards, arrangement assistance

Release history

References

External links
 Tam-Tam at Discogs
 Tam-Tam at Rate Your Music

1983 albums
Amanda Lear albums
Concept albums